Jinzhu may refer to the following locations in China:

 Jinzhu, Sichuan (Jīnzhū Zhèn), in Daocheng County, Garzê Tibetan Autonomous Prefecture, Sichuan
 Jinzhu, Zhejiang (Jīnzhú Zhèn), in Suichang County
 Jinzhu Township, Chongqing (Jīnzhú Xiāng), in Shizhu Tujia Autonomous County
 Jinzhu Township, Jilin (Jīnzhū Xiāng), in Longtan District, Jilin City
 Jinzhu Subdistrict (Jīnzhú Jiēdào), Xiaohe District, Guiyang, Guizhou
 Jinzhu, Guangxi (Jīnzhú Zhèn), in Cenxi
 Jinzhu, Huitong (金竹镇), a town of Huitong County, Hunan.

 Jinzhu Station (Jīnzhú Zhàn), on Line 3 of Chongqing Rail Transit